Austria competed at the 2019 Winter Deaflympics held between 12 and 21 December 2019 in Sondrio Province in Northern Italy.

Medalists

Alpine skiing 

Lukas Käfer won the bronze medal in the men's downhill event.

Melissa Köck won the bronze medals in the women's alpine combined, women's giant slalom and women's slalom events.

Snowboarding 

Lisa Zörweg won the silver medal in the women's snowboard cross event.

References 

Winter Deaflympics
Nations at the 2019 Winter Deaflympics